Emily James may refer to:

 Emily James, character in the British TV series Hotel Babylon
 Emily James, character in the British TV series Waterloo Road

See also
 Emily James Smith Putnam (1862-1944), American classical scholar
 Emily Janes (1846-1928), British women's rights activist